Ronald Ernest Grigg FRS (1928 or 1929 - 10 January 2021) was a British chemist and Professor of Organic Chemistry at the University of Leeds.

Education
Prior to university, Grigg worked at Glaxo Laboratories from 1952 to 1960 whilst studying part-time for his first degree.  He received his PhD from the University of Nottingham and undertook postdoctoral research at the University of Cambridge with the team led by Nobel Laureate Alexander (later Lord) Todd.

Academic career
Grigg was appointed to a lectureship in organic chemistry at Nottingham in 1965 and remained there until 1974 when he became Professor of Organic Chemistry at Queen's University, Belfast.  He was appointed Professor of Organic Chemistry at the University of Leeds in 1989.  He retired from Leeds in 2001 when he was made Emeritus Professor.

Honours
Grigg was elected a Fellow of the Royal Society (FRS) in 1999.

Death
Grigg died on 10 January 2021.

References

1920s births
Year of birth uncertain
2021 deaths
British chemists
Fellows of the Royal Society
Academics of the University of Leeds
Academics of Queen's University Belfast
Alumni of the University of Nottingham